The Klipplaat River is a river in the Eastern Cape Province of South Africa.

Course
The river then winds its way through the Amathole's ridges and flows in a general northwesterly direction, passing the town Whittlesea in the former Ciskei before joining the right bank of the Black Kei River 22 km south of Queenstown. The Black Kei flows generally east and eventually joins the Wit-Kei River, to become the Great Kei River.

Dams
 Waterdown Dam

See also
 List of rivers in South Africa

Rivers of the Eastern Cape